Charles Lindsay may refer to:
Charles Lindsay (British politician), British soldier, courtier and Conservative politician
Charles Lindsay (artist) (born 1961), American photographer and artist
Charles Lindsay (bishop) (1760–1846), Church of Ireland bishop
Charles Lindsay (Australian politician) (1812–1884), Scottish pastoralist and South Australia politician
Charles Lindsay of the Lindsay baronets

See also
Charles Lindsey (disambiguation)